Warwickshire Primary Care Trust was an NHS organisation in the United Kingdom which incorporates the former North Warwickshire, Rugby and South Warwickshire PCTs. It was established on 1 October 2006 and provides healthcare services from Polesworth in the north of the county through Royal Leamington Spa to Shipston in the south and Alcester in the west.  It was abolished in April 2013.

Board

Warwickshire PCT was headed up by Bryan Stoten as its Chairman and Gillian Entwhistle as its Interim Chief Executive following the departure of David Rose to become Managing Director of a leading private healthcare company.

External links
 Warwickshire Primary Care Trust's website

Defunct NHS trusts
Health in Warwickshire